The Helene-Lange-School is a comprehensive school in Wiesbaden, Germany. The school received much media coverage for its pedagogic methods. While proponents of comprehensive schools believe it is one of Germany's best schools, opponents believe it is just a run-of-the-mill-school that serves privileged children who would do just as well attending any other kind of school.

History

In 1847, the school was founded in Wiesbaden as Höhere Töchterschule. In 1955 the school was named after Helene Lange. At this time it was an all-girls school. In 1971 boys were admitted to the school. In 1986 it was converted into a comprehensive and Enja Riegel became headmistress of the school. In 1987 the school became a member of the UNESCO Associated Schools Project. In 2009 it became a Club-of-Rome-School.

Students

The school serves mainly upper-middle-class children. While 42% of all children visiting Wiesbaden schools have at least one parent born abroad, less than 10% of the Helene-Lange students do. Enja Riegel said she would love the Helene-Lange-School to become more diverse, but that minority youngsters simply did not apply for the school.

Programme for International Student Assessment

In 2002 the Helene-Lange-students participated in the Programme for International Student Assessment (PISA), doing well. Breaking the rule that PISA must not be used for school-level evaluation (for which it is methodologically not suited), the media were informed and the Helene-Lange-School was announced Germany's best school. Later it was revealed that while the students really did well, the school was outperformed by most Gymnasien (prep schools) in the south.

References

Schools in Wiesbaden
Educational institutions established in 1847
1847 establishments in Germany